A number of Anglican churches in Leicester are listed here. These belong to the Diocese of Leicester in the Church of England and are located in the city of Leicester, England.

Cathedral church

Cathedral Church of St Martin, Leicester

Open churches

Holy Trinity, Regent Road
St James the Greater, London Road
St Margaret's Church, St Margaret's Way

St Mary de Castro, Castle Yard
St Nicholas, St Nicholas Circle
St Peter, St Peter's Road
All Saints Church, Wigston Magna, Leicestershire, Bushloe End

Churches closed for regular services
St Mark, Belgrave Gate - Now "The Empire" Conference Centre
St Matthew, Montreal Road
St Paul, Kirby Road
St Saviour, St Saviour's Road 

St Wistan's, Wigston Magna, Leicestershire, Bull Head Street

References
Brandwood, Geoffrey K. (1984) The Anglican Churches of Leicester. Leicester: Leicestershire Museums, Art Galleries and Records Service
Where Leicester has Worshipped
University of Leicester Archaeology and Ancient History Interactive Geo map of sites
Ancient borough; lost churches

External links

 
churches church of England
Church of England church buildings in Leicester
Lists of churches in England